Serbia competed at the 2022 Winter Olympics in Beijing, China, from 4 to 20 February 2022.

Serbia's team consisted of two athletes (one per gender) competing in alpine skiing.

Marko Vukićević was the country's flagbearer during the opening ceremony. Meanwhile a volunteer was the flagbearer during the closing ceremony.

Competitors
The following is the list of number of competitors participating at the Games per sport/discipline.

Alpine skiing

By meeting the basic qualification standards, Serbia has qualified one male and one female alpine skier.

Non-competing sports

Cross-country skiing

By meeting the basic qualification standards, Serbia had qualified one male and two female cross-country skiers.

References

Nations at the 2022 Winter Olympics
2022
Winter Olympics